Korkut is a masculine Turkish name and surname. In Turkish, "korkut" means "big hailstone", "stern", and/or "resolute". An early example is Dede Korkut, a mythological figure in the Book of Dede Korkut. 

Notable persons with that name include:

Given name
 Şehzade Korkut (1467-1513) Ottoman prince
 Korkut Boratav (born 1935), Turkish economist
 Korkut Eken (born 1945), Turkish security officer 
 Korkut Özal (1929–2016), Turkish politician
 Korkut Uygun (born 1975), Turkish chemical engineer and a medical researcher
 Korkut Yaltkaya (1938–2001), Turkish academic

Surname
 Derviš Korkut (1888–1969), Bosnian librarian
 Kübra Öçsoy Korkut (born 1994), Turkish para table tennis player
 Tayfun Korkut (born 1974), Turkish footballer

Turkish-language surnames
Turkish masculine given names